Lake Vida is a hypersaline lake in Victoria Valley, the northernmost of the large McMurdo Dry Valleys, on the continent of Antarctica. It is isolated under year-round ice cover, and is considerably more saline than seawater. It came to public attention in 2002 when microbes frozen in its ice cover for more than 2,800 years were successfully thawed and reanimated.

Introduction
Lake Vida is one of the largest lakes in the McMurdo Dry Valley region and is a closed-basin endorheic lake. The permanent surface ice on the lake is the thickest non-glacial ice on earth, reaching a depth of at least . The ice at depth is saturated with brine that is seven times as saline as seawater. The ice cap has sealed the saline brine from external air and water for thousands of years creating a time capsule for ancient DNA. This combination of lake features make Lake Vida a unique lacustrine ecosystem on Earth.

The lake gained widespread recognition in December 2002 when a research team, led by the University of Illinois at Chicago's Peter Doran, announced the discovery of 2,800‑year‑old halophile microbes (primarily filamentous cyanobacteria) preserved in ice layer core samples drilled in 1996. The microbes reanimated upon thawing, grew and reproduced. Due to this discovery and the freezing mechanisms forming Lake Vida's ice-seal, Lake Vida is now noted as a location for research into Earth's climate and life under extreme conditions, specifically the fauna that could have existed on Mars. The unmanned Lake Vida Meteorological Station monitors climate conditions around the lake year round for such scientific study.

A 2010 field campaign, funded by the National Science Foundation through the American Recovery and Reinvestment Act of 2009, to investigate the microbiology and geochemistry of Lake Vida. Led by Peter Doran and Alison Murray from Nevada's Desert Research Institute, the expedition recovered ice cores, brine and sediment samples from the lake using clean drilling procedures to avoid contamination.

The lake itself has no permanent settlements or infrastructure. The nearby Lake Vida Meteorological Station is unmanned, sending meteorological data to McMurdo Dry Valleys Long Term Ecological Research organization. In addition to the unmanned observation station, a 5-day emergency supply of food for 6 people is cached  from the southwestern shore. Research teams establish temporary camps from which research activities are conducted on short term basis in the summer months.

Composition
Lake Vida does not possess many factors attributed to the existence of life formations. Lake Vida contains high levels of nitrous oxide (N2O) and also molecular hydrogen (H2). The chemicals are believed to be released from chemical reactions between the brine and underlying sediments. The molecular hydrogen may be crucial as an energy source for life in the lake and aids in justifying the presence of life in an oxygen-deprived environment.

Hydrology
Lake Vida has at least three named inflows: Victoria River, Kite Stream, and Dune Creek. Victoria River passes through the Vida Basin into Victoria Valley, Victoria Land as ephemeral glacial meltwater from the Upper Victoria Glacier, draining from Victoria Upper Lake,  to the northwest, to finally drain into the west end of Lake Vida. Kite Stream is also located in the Vida Basin and flows as ephemeral glacial meltwater west from the Victoria Lower Glacier into the east end of Lake Vida. The United States Geological Survey's Atlas of Antarctic Research maps up to nine Lake Vida inflows or outflows including Victoria River and Kite Stream. Meltwater flows for a few weeks in the summer months when temperatures rise sufficiently for the nearby glaciers to melt. The McMurdo Dry Valleys are classified as extreme desert.

Geology

Main geological features 
In the vicinity of Lake Vida, a variety of geological features are noted, the most significant being glaciers, lakes, valleys, ridges, and summits. There are approximately 25 named glaciers within a  radius with the nearest being Upper Victoria Glacier, Packard Glacier, Clark Glacier, and Clio Glacier. In the same radius, there are approximately 14 named ridges with the nearest being Robertsons Ridge, Helios Ridge, and Nottage Ridge. In addition to Victoria Valley, there are 16 named valleys with the nearest being Sanford Valley, Barwick Valley and McKelvey Valley. In addition to Upper Victoria Lake that feeds Lake Vida with meltwater, there are approximately 11 other lakes, the nearest being Lake Thomas. The summits around Lake Vida are as follows, Mautino Peak, Mount Saga, Mount Allen, Mount Theseus, Mount Cerberus, Mount Insel, Nickell Peak, and Sponsors Peak.

Other geological features
Other more minor features include benches, cliffs, gaps, and streams. The Victoria Valley dunefield, an approximately 1.5 km2 belt which is about 3.1 km long, lies to the east of Lake Vida. It is an important site for research into the landforms and processes of perennial niveo-aeolian environments.

Natural history
Kite Stream is named after a researcher, James Kite, who found numerous meteorites in the area (1977–1978).

History
Lake Vida lies north of Mount Cerberus in the Victoria Valley of Victoria Land. Named by the Victoria University of Wellington Antarctic Expedition (1958–59) after Vida (Vaida), a sledge dog of the Nimrod Expedition, 1910-13. Lake Vida was originally thought to be frozen to the lakebed.

Economy
Lake Vida has no noted economic features.   Any commercial benefits from the scientific expeditions to Lake Vida are indirect.

Life
Scientists have found life in an Antarctic Lake Vida that was sealed off from the outside world by a thick sheet of ice several thousands of years ago. The discovery of the ecosystem pushes the boundaries of what life can endure, and may inform the search for alien microbes on other planets, such as Mars, or on icy moons, for instance, Jupiter's moon Europa.

Species lists
The following eukaryote species have been catalogued within 1 degree of Lake Vida:

Kingdom Animalia
Phylum Arthropoda : Alloptes stercorarii (arachnida, mite), Tydeus setsukoae (arachnida, mite)
Phylum Rotifera : Philodina spp.
Phylum Tardigrada : Unknown sp.

Kingdom Fungi
Division Ascomycota : Lepraria sp.

Kingdom Plantae
Division Bryophyta : Bryum argenteum, Bryum pseudotriquetrum, Bryum subrotundifolium, Ceratodon purpureus, Didymodon gelidus, Grimmia antarctici, Grimmia sp., Pottia heimii, Sarconeurum glaciale,
Division Marchantiophyta : Cephaloziella exiliflora

Kingdom Protista
Phylum Ciliophora : Chilodonella sp., Epistylis sp., Euplotes sp., Halteria sp., Homalozoon sp., Nassula sp., Oxytricha sp., Pleuronema sp., Podophrya sp., Pyxidium sp., Saprophilus sp., Spathidium sp., Sphaerophrya sp., Vorticella sp.
Phylum Sarcomastigophora : Acanthocystis sp., Actinophyrys sp.,
Phylum Euglenozoa : Bodo sp. (kinetoplastid)

See also
Astrobiology
Extremophile

References

References
McMurdo Dry Valley Long Term Ecological Research
Terrestrial Biology
Paleolimnology of Extreme Cold Terrestrial and Extraterrestrial Environments
Subsurface Ice and Brine Sampling
Antarctic Lake Yields Ancient Bacteria
Lake Vida, Antarctica
Antarctica Lake Vida Find Life

External links
Resources
Meteorological Station Measurements, University of Colorado, Lake Vida entry
Antarctic Freshwater Diatoms, University of Colorado, Lake Vida entry
Ice Coring and Drilling Services Space Science and Engineering Center, University of Wisconsin-Madison, Lake Vida entry
McMurdo Dry Valleys Long Term Ecological Research VIAM data tables, Lake Vida entry
David Darling's Encyclopedia of Astrobiology, Lake Vida entry
News items
"Lake Water Secret", BBC news item
"Looking for lessons at Vida", The Antarctic Sun news item on borehole pollution at Lake Vida
Photographs
Google Maps image
National Geographic photograph of Lake Vida

Valleys of Antarctica
Lakes of Antarctica
Lakes of Victoria Land
McMurdo Dry Valleys
Endorheic lakes of Antarctica